Arginine carboxypeptidase may refer to:
 Lysine carboxypeptidase, an enzyme
 Carboxypeptidase U, an enzyme